8: Kindred Spirits (Live from the Lobero) is a 2020 live album by American jazz saxophonist Charles Lloyd. The album was released on 28 February 2020 on Blue Note Records to positive critical reviews.

Reception
At Metacritic, that assigns a normalized rating out of 100 to reviews from mainstream critics, the album received an average score of 80, based on four reviews, which indicates "generally favorable reviews".

David Whiteis of JazzTimes wrote, "at his best, Lloyd’s commitment to music as a vehicle of spiritual uplift places him in a pantheon that includes Coltrane, Ayler, Sanders, and their musical progeny—as well as, for better or worse, the jam bands that gestated in San Francisco during Lloyd’s early heyday and have since forged a musical genre (as well as an entire subculture) of their own." Thom Jurek of AllMusic stated, "Arguably, this edition of 8: Kindred Spirits, though only a first set, is one of Lloyd's strongest live offerings to date." Peter Gamble in his review for Jazz Journal commented, "It is encouraging to find Lloyd in such splendid form at this juncture in his life..." Rob Shepherd of PostGenre noted, "From his early sideman recordings with Chico Hamilton to his more recent Marvels group, [Lloyd] has refused to produce art that can be concisely boxed into any form. 8: Kindred Spirits (Live from the Lobero) perfectly surveys this nature of his work."

Track listing

Personnel
 Charles Lloyd – saxophone 
 Reuben Rogers – bass
 Eric Harland – drums 
 Julian Lage – guitar
 Gerald Clayton – piano

References

2020 live albums
Charles Lloyd (jazz musician) albums
Blue Note Records albums